Hello Babies is a 2014 Chinese-Hong Kong film directed by Vincent Kok.

Cast
Raymond Wong
Eric Tsang
Sandra Ng
Ronald Cheng
Fiona Sit
Alex Lam Dak Seon
Karena Ng
Miriam Yeung

Reception
The film has grossed US$11.17 million at the Chinese box office. It was one of the highest grossing local films in 2014.

References

Chinese comedy films
Hong Kong comedy films
Films directed by Vincent Kok
2010s Hong Kong films